Hajji Aqa Kandi (also Romanized as Ḩājjī Āqā Kandī) is a village in Qeshlaq-e Jonubi Rural District, Qeshlaq Dasht District, Bileh Savar County, Ardabil Province, Iran. At the 2006 census, its population was 189, in 35 families.

References 

Towns and villages in Bileh Savar County